Rucha Gujarathi  (born 1982/1983)  is an Indian Bollywood, television actress and model. She has acted in several Bollywood movies, soap operas, music albums and reality shows. She also acted as a child artist in several movies. She is best remembered for her lead role as "Suhana" (popularly known as Bhabhi) in  Hindi language soap opera Bhabhi on Star Plus.

Early life and education
Gujarathi was born in Mumbai in 1982 or 1983 and attended Mary Immaculate Girls' High School, Borivali to attain her Secondary education. She subsequently obtained a Diploma in Medical Lab Technology from SNDT Women's University.

Career
Gujarathi worked as a child artist in movies Dancer, Shabzade, Hum Hain Kamal Ke, Kanyadan and Shikari. Subsequently she appeared in several soap operas, music albums and reality shows. As a model, Gujarathi has done several commercials like Frooti, Emami, Clinic All Clear, Colgate, Pizza Hut India etc. She has also featured in music albums by Gurdas Maan, Pankaj Udhas and Vaishali Samant.

Filmography

Television

Reality shows

See also
 Cinema of India
 Bollywood
 Soap opera

References 

20th-century Indian actresses
21st-century Indian actresses
Female models from Mumbai
Indian soap opera actresses
1983 births
Living people
Actresses from Mumbai
Actresses in Hindi cinema